Évora de Alcobaça is a freguesia ("civil parish") in the municipality of Alcobaça, Portugal. The population in 2011 was 4,485, in an area of 42.42 km2.

History 

The Combat of Évora de Alcobaça took place on the 8th December 1810, during the Third French Invasion of Portugal. A foraging party of 80 French grenadiers was defeated by a detachment of about 80 of the Óbidos militia, led by Captain Joseph Fenwick. The captain was wounded in action and died of his wounds two days later. William Carr Beresford, Commander in Chief of the Portuguese Army, later lamented the loss of the young captain of the 1/3rd "The Buffs".

References

Leiria District
Alcobaça, Portugal